Bugorki is a rural locality (a selo) in Urkansky Selsoviet of Tyndinsky District, Amur Oblast, Russia. Its population was 62 in 2018. There are five streets.

Geography 
Bugorki is located on the Dzhalinda River, 151 km south of Tynda (the district's administrative centre) by road. Urkan is the nearest rural locality.

References 

Rural localities in Tyndinsky District